Capitol station is a Caltrain station located off Monterey Road near the Capitol Expressway, after which the station is named, in southern San Jose, California. The station is only served during weekday peak hours, with northbound trains in the morning and southbound trains in the evening.

The Communications Hill residential neighborhood, located just to the west, has no direct pedestrian access to the station. There are plans to construct a pedestrian bridge to link the station to the neighborhood.

See also
 Capitol station (disambiguation) - other train stations with similar names

References

External links

Caltrain - Capitol

Caltrain stations in Santa Clara County, California
Railway stations in San Jose, California
Railway stations in the United States opened in 1992